The National Company Law Appellate Tribunal (NCLAT) is a tribunal which was formed by the Central Government of  India under Section 410 of the Companies Act, 2013. The NCLAT was formed as a body with an appellate jurisdiction at the same time when NCLT was established as a major reform as per powers granted to the Ministry of Corporate Affairs in India,

The tribunal is responsible for hearing appeals from the orders of National Company Law Tribunal(s) (NCLT), starting on 1 June 2016.

The tribunal also hears appeals from orders issued by the Insolvency and Bankruptcy Board of India under Section 202 and Section 211 of IBC. It also hears appeals from any direction issued, decision made, or order passed by the Competition Commission of India (CCI) and the National Financial Reporting Authority (NFRA).

On 8 November 2021, Justice Ashok Bhushan has been appointed as the Chairperson of the Appellate Tribunal.

History and objective 

National Company Law Appellate Tribunal was formed on 1 June 2016 under Companies Act'2013. The tribunal was formed as appellate authority to the aggrieved persons against the orders of National Company Law Tribunal which were passed under Section 61 of the Insolvency and Bankruptcy Code, 2016.

The decisions of National Company Law Appellate Tribunal are appellable in Supreme Court of India. National Company Law Appellate Tribunal has principle bench in Delhi and other one in Chennai.

Structure of NCLAT 
The NCLAT includes  a Chairperson, 3 judicial members, and 2 technical members. It consists of a total of not more than eleven members. Ashok Bhushan, retired judge of Supreme Court is the current chairman of National Company Law Appellate Tribunal.

Qualifications for Judicial member at National Company Law Appellate Tribunal:

 Should be of 50 years old.
 Served at least 5 years as District Judge or High Court Judge or has a minimum 10 years experience serving in any judicial authority.

Qualifications for Technical member at National Company Law Appellate Tribunal:

 Should be of 50 years old.
 Any person practicing as a chartered Accountant, cost accountant or company secretary for a period of 15 years.
 Any person holding the rank of Secretary or Additional Secretary to the central government and is a member of the Indian Corporate Law Service or Indian Legal Service for more than 15 years.

Powers and functions 

Following are the powers and functions of National Company Law Appellate Tribunal.

 Orders issued by Competition Commission of India (CCI).
 Orders issued by Insolvency and Bankruptcy Board of India.

References 

Indian company law